Erythrose is a tetrose saccharide with the chemical formula C4H8O4. It has one aldehyde group, and is thus part of the aldose family.  The natural isomer is D-erythrose; it is a diastereomer of D-threose. 

Erythrose was first isolated in 1849 from rhubarb by the French pharmacist Louis Feux Joseph Garot (1798-1869), and was named as such because of its red hue in the presence of alkali metals (ἐρυθρός, "red").

Erythrose 4-phosphate is an intermediate in the pentose phosphate pathway and the Calvin cycle.

Oxidative bacteria can be made to use erythrose as its sole energy source.

See also
 Erythritol

References

Aldotetroses